Hippeastrum iguazuanum is a flowering perennial herbaceous bulbous plant in the family Amaryllidaceae. It is found from southern Brazil (Parana) to Argentina (Misiones), although it has been reported in other Brazilian states.

Description 
Hippeastrum iguazuanum  is a rare member of the genus Hippeastrum, considered to be part of the subgenus Omphalissa (Salisb.) Baker . It is deciduous, flowering in the early Spring (September–October). Flowers are yellow to green, with red veins and banded undulating tepals. Leaves are glaucous, and in some specimens the young leaves are dark purple.

Taxonomy 
First described by Pierfelice Ravenna in 1971, and formally named by Dudley and Williams in 1984

Etymology 
The name derives from its original collection and identification by Ravenna in the Iguazú National Park in Argentina.

Ecology 
Hippeastrum iguazuanum  prefers cliff faces with dense vegetation.

Cultivation 
Hippeastrum iguazuanum  is easily grown as a potted plant, or in gardens in Hardiness Zones of 10 or above (Mediterranean climate). It can be propagated from offset bulbils on the mother bulb.

References

Sources 
 
 GBIF: Hippeastrum iguazuanum
 Pacific Bulb Society: Hippeastrum iguazuanum (images)

Flora of South America
iguazuanum
Garden plants of South America